Eli Eric Saslow (born May 15, 1982) is an American journalist, currently a writer-at-large for The New York Times. He has also written for The Washington Post and ESPN The Magazine. He is a 2014 winner of the Pulitzer Prize, a recipient of the George Polk award and other honors. He was also a finalist for the Pulitzer Prize in feature writing in 2013, 2016 and 2017.

Education
He attended Heritage High School, in Littleton, Colorado, graduating in 2000, and is a 2004 graduate of the S.I. Newhouse School of Public Communications at Syracuse University.

Work
Saslow's 2018 book  was the winner of the 2019 Dayton Literary Peace Prize for Nonfiction.

He is the author of Ten Letters: The Stories Americans Tell Their President (Random House, 2012), and four of his works have appeared in the anthology The Best American Sports Writing.

Personal life
Saslow identifies as Jewish and is married.

Books
.
.

References

External links

"Pulitzer winner dug beyond politics to explore impact of food stamps on American families", appearance on PBS NewsHour

Living people
1982 births
People from Littleton, Colorado
American male journalists
Jewish American journalists
The Washington Post journalists
Pulitzer Prize for Explanatory Journalism winners
S.I. Newhouse School of Public Communications alumni
James Beard Foundation Award winners
Colorado Academy alumni
21st-century American Jews